Electrik is Maksim Mrvica's fourth album release. It was released on October 20, 2006.

Track listing

Disc 1
"The Gypsy Maid (from Il Trovatore)" (Giuseppe Verdi) – 3:40 
"Requiem (from Requiem)" (Giuseppe Verdi) – 2:58 
"Child in Paradise"  (Tonči Huljić) – 4:22	
"Anthem" (Tonči Huljić) – 4:11 
"Hall of the Mountain King" (from Peer Gynt) (Edvard Grieg) – 4:16
"Nathrach" (Troy Donockley) – 4:18
"Beyond Rangoon/Waters of Irrawaddy (from the film Beyond Rangoon)" (Hans Zimmer) – 4:34
"March of the Icons" (Tonči Huljić) – 3:56
"Tango in Ebony" (Tonči Huljić) – 3:57
"Carmen Entr'acte (from Carmen)" (Georges Bizet) – 3:39
"Prelude in C  (from Prelude and Fugue in C Minor)" (Johann Sebastian Bach) – 3:54
"In Paradisum (from Requiem)" (Gabriel Fauré) – 5:43
"The Way Old Friends Do" (ABBA) – 4:31

Disc 2
"The Gypsy Maid - Club Remix" – 6:51
"Prelude in C - Club Remix" – 4:12
"Requiem - Breaks Remix" – 6:16
"Child in Paradise - Co-Fusion Remix" – 5:21

External links
"Electrik"
 

Maksim Mrvica albums
2006 albums